The NCR XVs Champions Cup is a single-elimination tournament played each year in the United States featuring men's college rugby teams from National Collegiate Rugby (formerly National Small College Rugby Organization) to determine the national championship. 

From 2002 to 2006, event name was "East Coast Division 3 Collegiate Championship". In 2007, event was renamed to "NSCRO Men's Collegiate Division 3 National Championship", and "Champions Cup" since 2012.


Results 

Notes

See also
 College rugby
 Division 1-A Rugby
 Intercollegiate sports team champions

References